Dyschirius cerberus is a species of ground beetle in the subfamily Scaritinae. It was described by Larson in 1968.

References

cerberus
Beetles described in 1968